Kudzar (also Romanized as Kūdzar; also known as Koodraz, Kūdraz, and Kūzāl) is a village in Farmahin Rural District, in the Central District of Farahan County, Markazi Province, Iran. At the 2006 census, its population was 744, in 221 families.

References 

Populated places in Farahan County